Desulfovibrio sulfodismutans is a bacterium. It grows under strictly anaerobic conditions by disproportionation of thiosulfate or sulfite to sulfate and sulfide. ThAc01 is its type strain.

References

Further reading

External links 
LPSN

Superpathway of thiosulfate metabolism
Type strain of Desulfovibrio sulfodismutans at BacDive -  the Bacterial Diversity Metadatabase

Bacteria described in 1987
Desulfovibrio